Arad Rural District is a rural district (dehestan) in Arad District, Gerash County, Fars Province, Iran. At the 2016 census, its population (including Arad, which was subsequently detached from the rural district and promoted to city status) was 5,443, in 1,610 families.  The rural district has 10 villages.

References 

Rural Districts of Fars Province
Gerash County